Godán is one of 28 parishes (administrative divisions) in Salas, a municipality within the province and autonomous community of Asturias, in northern Spain.

Villages
Ablaneda 
Godán 
La Barrosa 
La Sala 
Otero (Outeiru) 
Reguera Oscura (Reguerascura)

References

Parishes in Salas